Steve Jobs (February 24, 1955 – October 5, 2011) was an American pioneer of the personal computer revolution of the 1970s (along with engineer, inventor, and Apple Computer co-founder, Steve Wozniak). Shortly after his death, Jobs's official biographer, Walter Isaacson, described him as the "creative entrepreneur whose passion for perfection and ferocious drive revolutionized six industries: personal computers, animated movies, music, phones, tablet computing, and digital publishing."

Books

Autobiographies/memoirs 
2018: Small Fry by Lisa Brennan-Jobs
2014: Steve Jobs: The Unauthorized Autobiography by J. T. Owens
2013: The Bite in the Apple: A Memoir of My Life with Steve Jobs by Chrisann Brennan
2006: iWoz by Steve Wozniak

Biographies and histories 
2015: Becoming Steve Jobs by Brent Schlender and Rick Tetzeli
2015: Steve Jobs and Philosophy: For Those Who Think Different, edited by Shawn E. Klein
2014: Creativity, Inc.: Overcoming the Unseen Forces That Stand in the Way of True Inspiration by Edwin Catmull of Pixar
2012: Steve Jobs: The man who thought different by Karen Blumenthal
2011: Steve Jobs by Walter Isaacson (the basis for the 2015 film,  Steve Jobs by Danny Boyle)
2005: iCon: Steve Jobs by Jeffrey S. Young & William L. Simon.
2005: What the Dormouse Said: How the 60s Counterculture Shaped the Personal Computer Industry by John Markoff
2004: Revolution in the Valley: The Insanely Great Story of How the Mac was Made by Andy Hertzfeld
2000: The Second Coming of Steve Jobs by Alan Deutschman.
1994: Insanely Great: The Life and Times of Macintosh, the Computer That Changed Everything by Steven Levy
1993: Steve Jobs & the NeXT Big Thing by  Randall E. Stross
1992/1996: Accidental Empires by Robert X. Cringely (the basis for the 1996 PBS documentary, Triumph of the Nerds)
1988: Steve Jobs: The Journey Is the Reward  by Jeffrey S. Young
1988: Accidental millionaire : the rise and fall of Steve Jobs at Apple Computer by Lee Butcher.
1984: Fire in the Valley: The Making of the Personal Computer by Michael Swaine and Paul Frieberger (Fire in the Valley: The Making of the Personal Computer, second edition, 2000 and Fire in the Valley: The Birth and Death of the Personal Computer, third edition, 2014; the basis for the 1999 film, Pirates of Silicon Valley by Martyn Burke).
1984: The Little Kingdom:The Private Story of Apple Computer by  Michael Moritz (the first history of Apple Computer, updated and reissued as Return to the Little Kingdom: Steve Jobs and the Creation of Apple  in 2009)
1984: Hackers: Heroes of the Computer Revolution by Steven Levy

Graphic novels 
2015: Steve Jobs: Insanely Great by Jessie Harland.
2012: The Zen of Steve Jobs by Caleb Melby with artwork by Jess3 that explores the relationship between Jobs and Kobun Chino Otogawa.
2012: Steve Jobs: Genius by Design a biographical graphic work by Jason Quinn (published by Campfire Graphic Novels)

Films and television series

Documentaries 
2015: Steve Jobs vs. Bill Gates: The Competition to Control the Personal Computer, 1974–1999: Original film from the National Geographic Channel for the American Genius series.
2015: Steve Jobs: The Man in the Machine, directed by Alex Gibney.
2012 (1995): Steve Jobs: The Lost Interview, directed by Paul Sen, written and narrated by Robert X. Cringely. The film includes the full 70-minute interview Jobs gave to Cringely for Triumph of the Nerds in 1995.
2011: Steve Jobs: Billion Dollar Hippy, a 2011 documentary TV film produced by BBC.
2011: Steve Jobs: One Last Thing, a documentary film produced by PBS. A slightly shortened and localized version of the show was broadcast in the United Kingdom the following day titled, Steve Jobs: iChanged the World on Channel 4.
2011: iGenius: How Steve Jobs Changed the World: a Discovery Channel documentary hosted by Adam Savage and Jamie Hyneman.
2001: Golden Dreams: a short film about the history of California shown at Disney California Adventure Park. Jobs is portrayed by Mark Neveldine.
1996:  Triumph of the Nerds: directed by Paul Sen, written and narrated by Robert X. Cringely. The film contains clips of interviews with Jobs conducted by Cringely in 1995.
1992: The Machine That Changed the World: Part 3 of this five-part documentary, called The Paperback Computer, prominently featured Jobs and his role in the early days of Apple.

Feature films 
2015: Steve Jobs: a feature film directed by Danny Boyle, with a screenplay by Aaron Sorkin.  Jobs is portrayed by Michael Fassbender.
2013: Jobs: an independent film directed by Joshua Michael Stern. Jobs is portrayed by Ashton Kutcher.
2013: iSteve: a satirical film directed by Ryan Perez in which Jobs is portrayed by Justin Long.
1999: Pirates of Silicon Valley: a TNT film directed by Martyn Burke. Jobs is portrayed by Noah Wyle.

Television series 
2021: American Horror Story: Double Feature: the tenth season in the FX series American Horror Story features a fictionalized cameo of Jobs in the eighth episode in which he is played by Len Cordova.
2011: American animated sitcom South Park parodies Steve as a maniac who kidnaps one of the characters to be a part of a "HumancentiPad" in the season 15 episode "Humancentipad".

Theater and opera 
2018: Plague – transmediale festival, composed by James Ferraro.
2017: The (R)evolution of Steve Jobs – Santa Fe Opera, composed by Mason Bates with libretto by Mark Campbell.
2012: The Agony and Ecstasy of Steve Jobs – The Public Theater, New York City, created and performed by Mike Daisey.

Video and games 
2018: Over My Dead Body (subject of interview on Amazon Prime TV comedy series)
1999: Noah Wyle and Steve Jobs at the 1999 Macworld NY (video clip) (references the 1999 film Pirates of Silicon Valley starring Noah Wyle as Jobs)
1997: Early version of Apple's "Think Different" ad  – Think different narrated by Jobs but never released on television
His '80s appearance was referenced in the 2017 video game Computer Tycoon; however he sports a blonde haircut rather than his black haircut.

Music 
2013: Jobs is portrayed by internet personality Nice Peter in a rap battle against Bill Gates in the YouTube channel Epic Rap Battles of History.

Fine Art 
2015: The Son of a Migrant from Syria, a mural near Calais, France, by street artist Banksy
2011: Statue of Jobs is built in Graphisoft Park in Budapest, Hungary

References

External links 
 Steve Jobs (Character) on IMDb
 
"Noah Wyle on playing Steve Jobs" (in the 1999 film, Pirates of Silicon Valley), Fortune. October 7, 2011.

Cultural depictions of Steve Jobs
Books about Steve Jobs